Joseph Richardson was born approx. 1792 in Cumberland, the eldest child of John Richardson (abt. 1762-1839) and Dinah Williamson (abt. 1768-1852). John and Dinah had married at Great Crosthwaite on 5 September 1791. Joseph’s young years were spent at Keswick, where his father was a miller. The Richardsons owned the Low Corn Mill beside the River Greta. After John’s death in 1839, Dinah lived with her second eldest child, Jonathan, and his family at Applethwaite. When Jonathan remarried she moved to a cottage in the village just a few doors away from where Joseph was living with his wife and family. She passed away on 29 February 1852. “On Sunday last, at Applethwaite, near Keswick, Mrs. Dinah Richardson, mother of the owner of the celebrated Rock Band, aged 83, much respected.”[1] “At Applethwaite, Underskiddaw, on the 29th ult., Dinah, relict of Mr. John Richardson, miller, aged 84 years.”[2]

Joseph, who was a gifted musician from birth, married Elizabeth Culling at Great Crosthwaite on 23 June 1816. They lived at Applethwaite and went on to have ten children, three dying in infancy. Joseph became a stone mason and spent thirteen years from 1827 to 1840 constructing a massive stone lithophone that he named ‘The Rock Harmonicon’, upon which he taught his three younger sons to play. It was the largest of the 'Musical Stones of Skiddaw'. 

In 1840, Joseph displayed the instrument at the Hutton Museum in Keswick. Many famous visitors came to the Lake District, including such dignitaries as Dr. Blomfield, the Bishop of London, and word soon spread about the musical stones. Joseph was persuaded to take the instrument to Whitehaven for a three week trial, and this proved so popular that he moved on to Liverpool. Here, he and his three young sons received a lot of help from the organist of Seaforth Parish Church, Mr. John Davies, before they left for Manchester. The Victorian inventor and industrialist James Nasmyth attended a performance and was moved to write to his friend Isaac Willis in London and, as a result, Joseph went to London to perform at the Royal Music Library. It was here that they came to the attention of two of the most eminent figures in the London musical world at the time. Sir George Smart was organist and composer to Her Majesty’s Chapel Royal, and Signor Michael Costa was composer and director to Her Majesty’s Theatre. They were both hugely impressed and lost no time in offering their public endorsements of the ‘Rock Harmonicon’

Signor Costa wrote several pieces of music specifically for Joseph, including a selection of pieces which were called ‘The Rock Harmonicon Airs’. He also composed a piece called ‘The Harmonious Stonemason’ as a companion to Handel’s ‘The Harmonious Blacksmith’, which was one of the band’s favourite pieces and which was particularly suited to the range and tonality of the Richardson instrument.

News of the Rock Harmonicon was spreading across the length and breadth of the country, and Joseph started receiving requests for performances away from the big cities. He had been four months in London, and he now began planning for a musical tour of certain towns in the south of the country. Leamington, Cheltenham, Oxford, Reading were each visited before another spell in London, this time at the rooms of George Stanley in Piccadilly.

The tour of Ireland was every bit as successful as the touring had been in England. With ticket prices pegged at sixpence in the balcony, and one shilling for the promenade, the policy was clearly to encourage people to attend, and it worked. For a little extra, the ladies could go home with a copy of a song, or a set of quadrilles or waltzes, and these were a great hit. The band was beginning to wake up to the value of merchandise, and even adopted its own early logo. Posters, handbills and programmes became a lot more sophisticated, and an early concept of marketing was being developed.

After the Ireland tour, concerts continued apace. Joseph and his sons began touring the British Isles incessantly, interspersed every so often with tours on the Continent, where they would perform in Paris, Brussels, Vienna and many more of the great European capital cities.

Over the following years there was not a county that was left unvisited, several on more than one occasion. Wales was toured, Scotland was toured, Ireland was re-visited, and the list of places visited includes some of the smallest villages, where only a handful of people would make up the audience, as well as several of the most prestigious London venues of the day where they would top the bill before packed houses. These included the Queen’s Concert Rooms at Hanover Square, the Egyptian Hall and the Exeter Hall.

Performing six days a week with just Sundays off, they would give two concerts each day, one in the early afternoon and the other in the evening. The afternoons were matinee performances and would invariably attract the local gentry, nobility and even aristocracy from the neighbourhood. Wonderful would have been the scenes as the carriages pulled up outside the venue and Dukes and Duchesses and their parties would glide into the room. The evening performances provided opportunity for those to attend who had to work during the day, and they were nearly always far more numerically attended. Joseph would always invite the audience to come up to the instrument either during the interval or after the close of the concert, and would take great delight in answering the many questions put to him, and would allow guests to play the notes whilst explaining to them the story of their construction.

In February 1848, by which time they had been performing for eight years, the Richardsons received a Royal Command to perform at Buckingham Palace before Queen Victoria, Prince Albert and an enormous host of European royalty and dignitaries. “ROYAL COMMAND. - Messieurs Richardson and Sons had the honour of attending with their unrivalled Band at Buckingham Palace, by express command, on Wednesday last, the 23rd of February, and performed a grand selection of music, from the works of the most eminent composers, in the presence of her Majesty the Queen, Prince Albert, the Duchess of Kent, the Duke and Duchess of Saxe Coburg, the Duke and Duchess of Cambridge, the Duchess of Gloucester, the Marquis and Marchioness of Clanricarde, the Earl of Aberdeen, &c. At the close of the performance, Her Majesty and Prince Albert were graciously pleased to express their entire approbation of the music selected for the Evening’s Entertainment, as well as the brilliant manner in which the pieces were executed, and entered into a most familiar conversation with the Messieurs Richardson, as to the invention and arrangement of their instruments, to all of which queries these Musical Gentlemen gave full and explicit answers.”[3]

As their popularity increased, so did the extent of Joseph’s ambition for his instrument. Not content with just having eight octaves of musical stones, he now determined to add Chinese steel bars, and, a little later, Swiss bells. These led to the instrument becoming known as ‘The Rock, Bell, and Steel Band’. The completion of the instrument came about with the addition of pedal-operated bass drums. These were commissioned from the internationally renowned inventor named Cornelius Ward and are believed to be the first pedal-operated bass drums to be made. They must have cost a fortune.

A tour of America and Canada had been in the planning stage for quite a long time, and eventually arrangements were made for a concert in the great Concert Hall of New York to take place in August 1852. This never happened, however, on account of the untimely bankruptcy of Isaac Willis. Without his services as agent, Joseph was unable to go ahead with the tour, and a lengthy and exhausting tour of Ireland was organised in its place. This lasted from 1851 into the following year.

By now the Richardson ‘Rock, Bell, and Steel Band’ was the entertainment of choice amongst the country’s elite. Whilst they were undertaking the tour of Ireland, they were contracted to perform at Lismore Castle, the Irish seat of the Duke of Devonshire. He was about to entertain the Duchess of Sutherland and he wanted to put on a show such as had never been seen before. The castle was brilliantly illuminated, with the serpentine walks beneath it that ran alongside the river tastefully emblazoned with transparent lamps every few yards. A huge dinner party was held on the Tuesday of the visit, but the pièce de résistance was saved for the Thursday evening. Races took place on the river, followed by fireworks, and then a “grand entertainment” took place, with the ‘Rock, Bell, and Steel Band’ as the star attraction. “A grand entertainment took place. The Messrs. Richardson and Sons had the honor of performing on their powerful and brilliant Rock, Bell, and Steel Band, before His Grace, the Duchess of Sutherland, Lady Constance Gower, the Hon. G.F. and Lady Cavendish, and a party amounting to nearly one hundred. The London press speak rapturously of the superior powers of this very extraordinary troup (sic). – The rock portion of their band, is found in some mountain fastnesses in Cumberland, and the powers of harmonious modulation it displays, are really wonderful. The Messrs. Richardson are making a musical tour through Ireland, and purpose visiting Waterford in the ensuing month. – Their pianissimo passages play most witchingly on the ear, and the fulness of tone (without any approach to shrillness) in the fortissimo, is equally grand indeed; whilst the powers of execution displayed by the performers, evince superior talent.”[4]

This was to be one of the last performances that the Richardsons gave. One of the sons was already feeling very unwell at the time, and it was only a few months later that the tour had to be terminated. He was the youngest of the three boys and by far the most technically accomplished. The band couldn’t continue without him, and father and sons made their way back to England and down to London, where Joseph had purchased the ‘Green Man’ Public House the previous year. It was by now May 1852 and the Richardsons had enjoyed almost unparalleled success for some twelve years.

Joseph Richardson passed away on 8 April 1855 at the ‘Green Man’. “The Morning Advertiser of the 17th inst., contained a record of the death of Mr. Joseph Richardson, a Cumberland worthy, whose abilities as a musician, and remarkable discoveries we many years ago made known to our readers. He dies at his residence Edgware Road, London, at the age of 66 years. He was a native of the parish of Crosthwaite, Keswick, where he worked at his trade as a mason for many years. While plying his calling he commenced to study the musical properties of stones, and by great labour and perseverance at last succeeded in producing a combination which afterwards became famous as the Rock Band, with which he has since travelled the country far and wide, and has everywhere drawn forth the eulogiums of musical critics. He was also the inventor of the Bell and Steel bands, but little if any less wonderful than the stone one, on which his three sons are very efficient and tasteful performers. The perfecting of the Rock Band, cost Mr. Richardson an immense amount of labour and entailed upon him and his family considerable privations during a period of no less than 13 years. At length, however, his perseverance was rewarded with the most unbounded success, and he produced an instrument from which, to adopt the language of a former notice, the softest tones of the flute, the sweetest tones of the piano, the shrillest pipings of the fife, and the loudest and most sonorous peals of the organ can be sent forth with a rapidity which produces the most ravishing sensations and fills the mind of the listener with wonder and delight. During the decline of his life Mr. Richardson was in comparatively affluent circumstances.”[5]

Recently the Richardsons' stones have gone on tour again.

A lakeside performance by Brian Dewan and Jamie Barnes was part of the Coniston Water Festival. A special frame and sound box was constructed to mount the stones for the performance. Dewan used 35 of the 60 slate notes for his composition. These notes corresponding to the white notes on a piano. The performance was also broadcast on radio.

This performance was repeated at the University of Leeds in May 2006; new music was performed and recorded as part as the Liverpool Biennial 2006. For these performances the Stones were joined by a Chinese classical orchestra, and the bells of Liverpool Cathedral.

In January 2006, the Musical Stones reached a large national audience when they were featured as part of a BBC Radio 4 documentary on Cumbrian musical stones presented by classical percussionist Evelyn Glennie. This documentary was entitled "The World's First Rock Band". In June 2006, the Stones were featured on National Public Radio across America.

Keswick Museum and Art Gallery were also involved with a three-year project set up by Yorkshire Quarry Arts based at the University of Leeds. It was an interdisciplinary project to find out why hornfels has musical properties, carry out historical research on the Cumbrian sets of musical stones and organise a series of performances. The Musical Stones of Skiddaw were played in several events for Yorkshire Quarry Arts.

In 2007 and 2008, Keswick Museum and Art Gallery collaborated with the music charity Soundwave and Changeling Productions to produce a theatrical performance entitled 'The Musical Stonemason - A Cumbrian Wayang'. This show told the story of how the Musical Stones were discovered by Peter Crosthwaite and made famous by Joseph Richardson. The show was performed at the Royal Festival Hall, London and The Sage Gateshead in 2007 as well as several shows across Cumbria in 2008.

In 2017, a series of 'Monster Solid Rock Lithophone Concerts' by Gordon Pickering took place.[6]

References 
[1] The Westmorland Gazette, Saturday, March 6, 1852, p.5.

[2] Carlisle Journal, Friday, March 5, 1852, p.3.

[3] COURT CIRCULAR: Saturday, February 26, 1848

[4] The Waterford Mail, Saturday, November 22, 1851, p.2.

[5] Attributed to The Morning Advertiser by The Carlisle Patriot, Saturday, April 21, 1855, p.8.

[6] “Monster Solid Rock Lithophone Concerts”. www.keswickmuseum.org.uk. Retrieved 3 December 2020.

External links
 "The Rock, Bell, and Steel Band". https://richardsonrockband.com
 

1790 births
1855 deaths
Burials at Kensal Green Cemetery
19th-century English musicians